The Third Doctor Adventures is a sci-fi audio series produced by Big Finish Productions based on the TV show Doctor Who. It sees the return of Katy Manning as Jo Grant, Richard Franklin as Mike Yates, and John Levene as Sergeant Benton while the voice of the Third Doctor is performed by Tim Treloar replacing the original actor, Jon Pertwee, who died in 1996.

The first set of stories was released in September 2015, featuring Treloar, Manning, and Franklin. A second and third volume were released November 2016 and August 2017 respectively. A fourth volume was released in March 2018.

The fifth and sixth volumes were released in May 2019 and May 2020, respectively. The sets feature Treloar and Manning joined by Levene with Jon Culshaw as The Brigadier, replacing Nicholas Courtney who died in 2011. The fifth volume also introduced Daisy Ashford in her mother's role of Liz Shaw. The seventh volume also saw the return of Sadie Miller in her mother's role of Sarah Jane Smith, having first appeared for Big Finish in Return of the Cybermen.

Cast

Notable guests

Rufus Hound as The Monk 
Ian McNeice as Winston Churchill 
Frazer Hines as Jamie McCrimmon 
Gerran Howell as Kaleidoscope
Christopher Naylor as Harry Sullivan

Episodes

Volume 1 (2015)

Volume 2 (2016)

Volume 3 (2017)

Volume 4 (2018)

Volume 5 (2019)

Volume 6 (2020)

Volume 7 (2021)

Volume 8 (2021)

The Annihilators (2022)

Kaleidoscope (2022)

The Return of Jo Jones (2023)

The Third Doctor Adventures 2023B 
A boxset is scheduled in  October 2023. No casting details have been confirmed though Treloar is expected to return.

Awards and nominations

References

Audio plays based on Doctor Who
Big Finish Productions
Doctor Who spin-offs